Supreme Sultan (March 12, 1966 – December 6, 1983) was an American Saddlebred stallion. He was a chestnut, and was sired by Valley View Supreme, out of Melody Olee. Sultan was sold to Barlite Farms as a yearling, was shown as a 2-year-old, but then repurchased and returned to Ruxer Farms. During his lifetime, he sired multiple champion offspring in nearly every division of American Saddlebred horse show competition and set leading sire records. Noted for his refinement and action, his impact as a sire modernized the Saddlebred breed in both the United States and South Africa. As a result of his influence on the breed, at his death he was buried at Kentucky Horse Park and a bronze statue of him stands atop his grave.

Life and career
Supreme Sultan was foaled on March 12, 1966. He was a red chestnut, sired by Valley View Supreme, out of Melody Olee.

As a yearling in 1968 at the Kentucky State Fair, Supreme Sultan was sold to Barlite Farm in San Antonio, Texas. Supreme Sultan was bought to replace his sire, Valley View Supreme, a breeding stallion, who died in 1967 from a heart attack. Later though, he was repurchased and returned to Ruxer Farms. At the age of 11, Sultan topped the futurity sire ratings of Saddle and Bridle magazine, the youngest horse to accomplish this feat. Bill Caldwell, Sultan's breeding manager commented on him, "He was like a human – he had more guts and courage than any horse I've ever seen. He was the show horse the minute he was born."

Supreme Sultan started his show ring career as a two-year-old. Tom Moore showed two-year-old Sultan in fine harness, winning the Illinois and Indiana Futurities. He also won the two-year-old stakes at the Chicago International, and the American Royal. He was noted for being more refined in appearance than other Saddlebreds of his time, and also admired for his very high and elegant action, particularly in his hindquarters. His influence as a sire changed the look of the American Saddlebred breed, and he is considered the horse who changed the look of the breed to the phenotype seen today.

Supreme Sultan was euthanized, on December 6, 1983, at the age of 17 due to colic. He was buried at the Kentucky Horse Park in Lexington, Kentucky. A year before his death, a 1/5 scale bronze statue of Sultan was made by Patrica Crane, and upon his death, she recreated the sculpture at full-size to immortalize him. The life size statue now stands upon his grave.

Offspring
Supreme Sultan sired Saddlebreds who became World Champions in virtually all show divisions. Society Diana was the first mare bred to Supreme Sultan. Out of her, Sultan had his first foal, Freedom Hall. Notable offspring include Imperator, Sultan's Great Day, Sultan's Starina, Sultan's Heir, Sultan's Santana, and Sultan's Royalty. Sultan's Santana was notable in his own right as the first American Saddlebred to sell for over $1 million. Some of Supreme Sultan's offspring were exported to South Africa, including his son Supreme O' Lee. He is considered the horse that created the modern style of American Saddlebred in both the United States and South Africa.

Pedigree
Supreme Sultan's sire, Valley View Supreme, was the only stallion ever to become Three Gaited World Grand champion. His dam, Melody Olee, is one of the many listed in the Broodmare Hall of Fame. She foaled 4 ribbon winners that were sold at the Kentucky State Fair.

References

External links
 Summertimefarm.com
 Theamericansaddlebred.blogspot.com
 Saddlehorsereport.com

Individual American Saddlebreds